Judith H. Willis is an American biologist currently Professor Emeritus at University of Georgia and an Elected Fellow of the American Association for the Advancement of Science. Her research frequently involved insect cuticular proteins (CPs) as molecular markers of metamorphic stage, precise role CPs play in constructing insects and annotating the CP genes of Anopheles gambiae, the major vector of malaria.

References

Year of birth missing (living people)
Living people
Fellows of the American Association for the Advancement of Science
21st-century American biologists
University of Georgia faculty